The Third Barr Ministry is the 15th ministry of the Government of the Australian Capital Territory, led by Labor Chief Minister Andrew Barr and his deputy Yvette Berry. It was appointed on 4 November 2020 to replace the Second Barr Ministry, following the 2020 general election held two weeks earlier.

On 23 October 2020, the Greens, who won 6 seats in the election and were in a coalition with Labor for the past two parliamentary terms, announced they were prepared to continue the coalition with Labor. However, they also requested that Barr create seats in the upcoming ministry and appoint additional Greens ministers. On 24 October 2020, after final votes were counted, it was announced that Attorney-General Gordon Ramsay lost his seat in Ginninderra. He remained as Attorney-General until the new ministry was sworn in.

In early November, the Greens signed a new formal Parliamentary and Governing Agreement with Labor which continued to maintain Greens leader Shane Rattenbury's position in the Ministry as well as adding a further two Greens ministers, whilst mandating that the Greens not move or support any motion of no confidence in the Labor Government, except in instances of gross misconduct or corruption.

Current arrangement
Following Labor's re-election at the 2020 general election, a new ministry was appointed on 4 November 2020. The cabinet was expanded from eight to nine ministers. Tara Cheyne, Rebecca Vassarotti and Emma Davidson were newly appointed to the ministry, replacing Gordon Ramsay and Suzanne Orr.

On 17 February 2021, the position of Assistant Minister for Families and Community Services was renamed Assistant Minister for Seniors, Veterans, Families and Community Services.

Party breakdown

References

Australian Capital Territory ministries
Australian Labor Party ministries in the Australian Capital Territory